The second season of the HBO Max streaming comedy-drama television series Hacks debuted on May 12, 2022, and concluded on June 2, 2022. It consists of eight episodes, each with approximate runtime of 30–35 minutes. The season centers Deborah Vance perfecting material for her new stand-up show, in which she shares previously unrevealed information about her personal life. In an effort to become a better person, Ava gets a "dumb phone" and swears off alcohol. The season received critical acclaim. Jean Smart won her second successive Primetime Emmy Award for Outstanding Lead Actress in a Comedy Series.

Plot
Fresh off her final middling performance, Deborah plans a nationwide tour to perfect the material. Ava is wracked by guilt because of the email she sent to two British television producers detailing Deborah's problematic behavior. Marcus copes with his breakup by getting a puppy, Joe. He begins partying with a group of younger gay men. 

Jimmy gets Kayla switched off his desk by HR rep Barbara, by agreeing to attend an anger management course. Jimmy meets with Janet Stone, the British producers' manager. She initially agrees the email will remain confidential, but turns on him when she discovers he backed out of buying her home. Jimmy appeals to his boss, Kayla's father, for help. He agrees, but asks Jimmy to bring Kayla back on as his assistant.

During a visit to Sedona to see Deborah's psychic, Ava confesses that she sent the email. Deborah is livid. Jimmy informs Ava that Deborah is suing Ava for violating her NDA.

Deborah, Ava, and Damien head out together on Deborah's tour bus, managed by "Weed". Ava buys a "dumb phone" and vows to be sober, determined to turn over a new leaf. Deborah defends Ava when Weed accidentally throws out Ava's father's remains. They backtrack to a fast food dumpster and find the ashes.

Marcus accidentally books Deborah a gig on a lesbian cruise, where Ava is immediately taken with a non-monogamous lesbian couple. Deborah's gig on the cruise starts strong but is derailed when she makes a misogynistic joke. 

One night Marcus returns from the club to find that Joe has ingested some of his prescription medication. The emergency vet treats the dog but refuses to release him back into Marcus's care. Marcus is distraught, so Deborah invites him to join them on tour.

At a tour stop in the Midwest, Deborah runs into one of her old stand-up friends, Susan Essig, who is now working at Lord & Taylor. Deborah feels guilty because years ago she sabotaged Susan at a stand-up showcase. She confesses to Susan, who states that she actually quit comedy due to an unplanned pregnancy. Ava and Marcus bond at the State Fair.

While at a show in Memphis, Ava's mother surprises the group by showing up. Ava argues with her about her involvement in an MLM scheme. Deborah goes home with Jason, a much younger man she meets at a bar. 

Deborah plans to tape a stand-up special with the confessional material. She enlists her old friend Elaine Carter to direct, and she meets with network executives in Los Angeles but is dissatisfied with the one offer she receives. Jimmy quits Latitude when the partners try to re-assign Deborah to a different manager. Kayla goes with him. Deborah vows to produce the special herself. Marty agrees to let her use the Palmetto to film the special. Deborah is surprised to learn that he's engaged to his age-appropriate girlfriend.

Ava's old friend Taylor invites Ava to do a short-term writing gig in LA that will overlap with Deborah's taping. Deborah encourages her to take the opportunity. The night of the special, Ava surprises Deborah by flying back early to be there. During the taping, an audience member has a cardiac event. He is rushed out by the paramedics but dies on the gurney. Jimmy lies about his health and the rest of the performance finishes smoothly.  

Deborah's DVD release of the special, My Bad, sells out in minutes on QVC. Jimmy informs Deborah that there is a bidding war for the rights to the special.  

At the network's release party, Deborah publicly thanks Ava for her work on the special. That night she fires Ava so Ava can develop her own career. Back in Los Angeles, Jimmy informs her that Deborah that dropped the lawsuit.

Cast and characters

Main
 Jean Smart as Deborah Vance, a revered stand-up comedian in the twilight of her career
 Hannah Einbinder as Ava Daniels, a young comedy writer and Deborah's writing partner
 Carl Clemons-Hopkins as Marcus, the newly-promoted CEO of Deborah's company

Recurring
 Mark Indelicato as Damien, Deborah's personal assistant
 Paul W. Downs as Jimmy LuSaque Jr., Deborah and Ava's manager
 Christopher McDonald as Marty Ghilain, CEO of the Palmetto Casino
 Rose Abdoo as Josefina, Deborah's estate manager
 Megan Stalter as Kayla Schaeffer, Jimmy's assistant
 Poppy Liu as Kiki, Deborah's blackjack dealer
 Kaitlin Olson as Deborah "DJ" Vance Jr., Deborah's daughter
 Johnny Sibilly as Wilson, a water inspector and Marcus's ex-boyfriend
 Angela Elayne Gibbs as Robin, Marcus's mother
 Jane Adams as Nina Daniels, Ava's mother
 Lorenza Izzo as Ruby, Ava's ex-girlfriend
 Luenell as Miss Loretta, Robin's friend
 Joe Mande as Ray, a hotel clerk for the Palmetto
 Ally Maki as Taylor, a television producer and friend of Ava's
 Lauren Weedman as Madame Mayor Pezzimenti, mayor of Las Vegas
 Caitlin Reilly as Jessica, a network executive

Guest
 Martha Kelly as Barbara, a human resources representative at Jimmy's firm 
 Ming-Na Wen as Janet Stone, a talent manager with a grudge against Jimmy 
 Laurie Metcalf as "Weed", Deborah's tour manager
 Maleah Goldberg and May Hong as a lesbian couple Ava meets on a cruise
 Harriet Harris as Susan Essig, a former stand-up comedian Deborah knew at the beginning of her career 
 Susie Essman as Elaine Carter, Deborah's old friend and a director
 Devon Sawa as Jason, a younger man Deborah meets at a bar 
 Wayne Newton and Margaret Cho appear as themselves

Episodes

Production
Co-creator Paul W. Downs discussed the focus of season two: "What we were most interested in exploring was what it’s like for someone like her to keep bombing,” Downs said. “It might be something novel and might be something exciting in the beginning, but someone like her who has fans that come to see her, and sells out a 2,000-seat theater in Vegas and crushes, what is it like when you’re on the road in small venues and not doing well?" Downs and co-creators Lucia Aniello and Jen Statsky wanted to continue to feature Kayla and Jimmy's dynamic, as well as show a more vulnerable side to Deborah by giving her a lover. Of the season finale, Aniello stated, "We feel like we have just told two chapters of a larger story. We feel like what we’ve done at the end of season two is just as much of a cliffhanger as what we did at the end of season one, considering what we intend to do with the story." 

Production designer Alec Contestabile oversaw production of over 130 new sets for the season, which primarily takes place during Deborah's stand-up tour.

Season two has a total of eight episodes. The trailer for season two was released on April 14, 2022. The first two episodes debuted on HBO Max on May 12, 2022. Hacks was renewed for a third season on June 16, 2022.

Reception

Critical reception 
The second season received critical acclaim. On Rotten Tomatoes, it has an approval rating of 100% based on 51 critic reviews, with an average rating of 8.70/10. The website's critics consensus states, "Hacks hits the road, but Jean Smart and Hannah Einbinder remain very much at home with each other in a sterling sophomore season that finds novel ways to deepen the central pair's lovable friendship." On Metacritic, it received a score of 88 out of 100 based on 24 critics, indicating "universal acclaim".

Danette Chavez wrote positively of the season in TheWrap, "Hacks remains one of the most consummately funny shows on TV, defying the sophomore slump to uncover ever more trenchant truths about ambition, failure, and the blurring line between work and family." Caroline Framke praised the direction in a review for Variety: "Still, as funny as “Hacks” is, and as poignant as it can be, the show’s most enduring strength is still its directing. Honed so brilliantly by Aniello, from some of the best “Broad City” episodes until her “Hacks” Emmy win, it finds surreal and beautiful moments no matter the circumstance." RogerEbert.coms Brian Tallerico noted the acting of star Jean Smart: "The range of her work in “Fargo,” “Watchmen,” and now “Hacks” is stunning, and the character she’s crafting on this HBO Max Emmy winner for directing, writing, and actress could be career-defining."

Accolades 
Season two received 17 Primetime Emmy Award nominations, including Outstanding Lead Actress in a Comedy Series for Jean Smart, which she won for the second year in a row.

Awards and nominations

References

External links 
 

2022 American television seasons
Hacks (TV series)